Enrique Villén Cruz (born 1 May 1960) is a Spanish actor, best known for his supporting performances in films directed by Álex de la Iglesia. He was nominated for the 2005 Goya Award for Best Supporting Actor for his performance in Ninette.

Biography 
Enrique Villén Cruz was born on 1 May 1960 in Madrid. He worked as a comedian already at age 16. He made his film debut at age 28.

Selected filmography

References

External links
 

Living people
Male actors from Madrid
Spanish male film actors
Spanish male television actors
21st-century Spanish male actors
1960 births